The 1989–90 Pittsburgh Penguins season saw the Penguins finish fifth in the Patrick Division and not qualify for the playoffs.

The last remaining active member of the 1989–90 Pittsburgh Penguins was Mark Recchi, who retired after the 2010–11 season, right after winning the Stanley Cup as a member of the Boston Bruins.

Regular season

The Penguins allowed the most short-handed goals during the regular season, with 21.

All-Star Game

The 41st National Hockey League All-Star Game was held in Civic Arena in Pittsburgh, home to the Pittsburgh Penguins, on January 21, 1990. The game saw the team of all-stars from the Wales conference defeat the Campbell conference all-stars 12–7.  Mario Lemieux was named the game's Most Valuable Player.

Season standings

Schedule and results

|- style="background:#fcf;"
| 1 || Oct 5 || Pittsburgh Penguins || 4–5 || Boston Bruins || 0–1–0 || 0
|- style="background:#ffc;"
| 2 || Oct 7 || Pittsburgh Penguins || 4–4 || New Jersey Devils || 0–1–1 || 1
|- style="background:#cfc;"
| 3 || Oct 10 || Winnipeg Jets || 1–5 || Pittsburgh Penguins || 1–1–1 || 3
|- style="background:#cfc;"
| 4 || Oct 14 || Montreal Canadiens || 1–2 || Pittsburgh Penguins || 2–1–1 || 5
|- style="background:#fcf;"
| 5 || Oct 15 || Pittsburgh Penguins || 2–4 || New York Rangers || 2–2–1 || 5
|- style="background:#cfc;"
| 6 || Oct 17 || Toronto Maple Leafs || 5–7 || Pittsburgh Penguins || 3–2–1 || 7
|- style="background:#fcf;"
| 7 || Oct 18 || St. Louis Blues || 9–3 || Pittsburgh Penguins || 3–3–1 || 7
|- style="background:#fcf;"
| 8 || Oct 21 || Buffalo Sabres || 4–2 || Pittsburgh Penguins || 3–4–1 || 7
|- style="background:#fcf;"
| 9 || Oct 25 || Toronto Maple Leafs || 8–6 || Pittsburgh Penguins || 3–5–1 || 7
|- style="background:#ffc;"
| 10 || Oct 26 || Pittsburgh Penguins || 3–3 || Detroit Red Wings || 3–5–2 || 8
|- style="background:#fcf;"
| 11 || Oct 28 || Pittsburgh Penguins || 1–5 || Montreal Canadiens || 3–6–2 || 8
|- style="background:#fcf;"
| 12 || Oct 31 || Los Angeles Kings || 8–4 || Pittsburgh Penguins || 3–7–2 || 8
|-

|- style="background:#cfc;"
| 13 || Nov 2 || New York Islanders || 2–5 || Pittsburgh Penguins || 4–7–2 || 10
|- style="background:#cfc;"
| 14 || Nov 4 || Pittsburgh Penguins || 3–1 || Edmonton Oilers || 5–7–2 || 12
|- style="background:#fcf;"
| 15 || Nov 5 || Pittsburgh Penguins || 3–5 || Vancouver Canucks || 5–8–2 || 12
|- style="background:#fcf;"
| 16 || Nov 9 || Pittsburgh Penguins || 3–4 || Chicago Blackhawks || 5–9–2 || 12
|- style="background:#fcf;"
| 17 || Nov 11 || Pittsburgh Penguins || 3–8 || St. Louis Blues || 5–10–2 || 12
|- style="background:#cfc;"
| 18 || Nov 14 || New York Rangers || 0–6 || Pittsburgh Penguins || 6–10–2 || 14
|- style="background:#cfc;"
| 19 || Nov 16 || Quebec Nordiques || 2–8 || Pittsburgh Penguins || 7–10–2 || 16
|- style="background:#cfc;"
| 20 || Nov 18 || New York Islanders || 3–5 || Pittsburgh Penguins || 8–10–2 || 18
|- style="background:#fcf;"
| 21 || Nov 22 || New Jersey Devils || 6–3 || Pittsburgh Penguins || 8–11–2 || 18
|- style="background:#cfc;"
| 22 || Nov 24 || Pittsburgh Penguins || 7–4 || Washington Capitals || 9–11–2 || 20
|- style="background:#fcf;"
| 23 || Nov 25 || Washington Capitals || 4–1 || Pittsburgh Penguins || 9–12–2 || 20
|- style="background:#fcf;"
| 24 || Nov 28 || Philadelphia Flyers || 6–3 || Pittsburgh Penguins || 9–13–2 || 20
|- style="background:#fcf;"
| 25 || Nov 30 || Pittsburgh Penguins || 1–4 || Philadelphia Flyers || 9–14–2 || 20
|-

|- style="background:#cfc;"
| 26 || Dec 2 || Pittsburgh Penguins || 7–4 || Quebec Nordiques || 10–14–2 || 22
|- style="background:#cfc;"
| 27 || Dec 6 || Washington Capitals || 3–5 || Pittsburgh Penguins || 11–14–2 || 24
|- style="background:#cfc;"
| 28 || Dec 8 || Pittsburgh Penguins || 3–2 || New Jersey Devils || 12–14–2 || 26
|- style="background:#fcf;"
| 29 || Dec 9 || Chicago Blackhawks || 6–4 || Pittsburgh Penguins || 12–15–2 || 26
|- style="background:#cfc;"
| 30 || Dec 12 || Boston Bruins || 5–7 || Pittsburgh Penguins || 13–15–2 || 28
|- style="background:#ffc;"
| 31 || Dec 14 || Pittsburgh Penguins || 4–4 || Minnesota North Stars || 13–15–3 || 29
|- style="background:#fcf;"
| 32 || Dec 16 || Pittsburgh Penguins || 3–4 || Calgary Flames || 13–16–3 || 29
|- style="background:#fcf;"
| 33 || Dec 19 || Hartford Whalers || 8–4 || Pittsburgh Penguins || 13–17–3 || 29
|- style="background:#cfc;"
| 34 || Dec 21 || Washington Capitals || 2–5 || Pittsburgh Penguins || 14–17–3 || 31
|- style="background:#fcf;"
| 35 || Dec 23 || Pittsburgh Penguins || 6–8 || New York Islanders || 14–18–3 || 31
|- style="background:#fcf;"
| 36 || Dec 26 || Pittsburgh Penguins || 3–6 || Washington Capitals || 14–19–3 || 31
|- style="background:#cfc;"
| 37 || Dec 27 || New York Rangers || 4–7 || Pittsburgh Penguins || 15–19–3 || 33
|- style="background:#cfc;"
| 38 || Dec 31 || Pittsburgh Penguins || 5–4 || New York Rangers || 16–19–3 || 35
|-

|- style="background:#fcf;"
| 39 || Jan 2 || Boston Bruins || 5–2 || Pittsburgh Penguins || 16–20–3 || 35
|- style="background:#cfc;"
| 40 || Jan 4 || Vancouver Canucks || 3–4 || Pittsburgh Penguins || 17–20–3 || 37
|- style="background:#cfc;"
| 41 || Jan 6 || Winnipeg Jets || 3–5 || Pittsburgh Penguins || 18–20–3 || 39
|- style="background:#cfc;"
| 42 || Jan 8 || Pittsburgh Penguins || 7–5 || New York Rangers || 19–20–3 || 41
|- style="background:#fcf;"
| 43 || Jan 10 || Pittsburgh Penguins || 3–6 || New Jersey Devils || 19–21–3 || 41
|- style="background:#cfc;"
| 44 || Jan 12 || Pittsburgh Penguins || 6–4 || Washington Capitals || 20–21–3 || 43
|- style="background:#cfc;"
| 45 || Jan 16 || Philadelphia Flyers || 3–4 || Pittsburgh Penguins || 21–21–3 || 45
|- style="background:#ffc;"
| 46 || Jan 18 || New York Rangers || 3–3 || Pittsburgh Penguins || 21–21–4 || 46
|- style="background:#fcf;"
| 47 || Jan 23 || New Jersey Devils || 4–2 || Pittsburgh Penguins || 21–22–4 || 46
|- style="background:#cfc;"
| 48 || Jan 25 || Pittsburgh Penguins || 5–3 || Detroit Red Wings || 22–22–4 || 48
|- style="background:#fcf;"
| 49 || Jan 27 || Pittsburgh Penguins || 3–9 || New York Islanders || 22–23–4 || 48
|- style="background:#fcf;"
| 50 || Jan 28 || Pittsburgh Penguins || 2–7 || Buffalo Sabres || 22–24–4 || 48
|- style="background:#fcf;"
| 51 || Jan 30 || Philadelphia Flyers || 6–3 || Pittsburgh Penguins || 22–25–4 || 48
|-

|- style="background:#cfc;"
| 52 || Feb 2 || Edmonton Oilers || 3–6 || Pittsburgh Penguins || 23–25–4 || 50
|- style="background:#fcf;"
| 53 || Feb 3 || Pittsburgh Penguins || 4–8 || Toronto Maple Leafs || 23–26–4 || 50
|- style="background:#fcf;"
| 54 || Feb 6 || New York Islanders || 8–7 OT || Pittsburgh Penguins || 23–27–4 || 50
|- style="background:#cfc;"
| 55 || Feb 8 || Washington Capitals || 5–7 || Pittsburgh Penguins || 24–27–4 || 52
|- style="background:#cfc;"
| 56 || Feb 10 || Los Angeles Kings || 6–7 || Pittsburgh Penguins || 25–27–4 || 54
|- style="background:#cfc;"
| 57 || Feb 11 || Pittsburgh Penguins || 4–1 || Philadelphia Flyers || 26–27–4 || 56
|- style="background:#cfc;"
| 58 || Feb 14 || Pittsburgh Penguins || 4–3 || New York Rangers || 27–27–4 || 58
|- style="background:#ffc;"
| 59 || Feb 16 || Pittsburgh Penguins || 3–3 || Winnipeg Jets || 27–27–5 || 59
|- style="background:#fcf;"
| 60 || Feb 18 || Pittsburgh Penguins || 4–6 || Chicago Blackhawks || 27–28–5 || 59
|- style="background:#cfc;"
| 61 || Feb 20 || Philadelphia Flyers || 4–6 || Pittsburgh Penguins || 28–28–5 || 61
|- style="background:#cfc;"
| 62 || Feb 22 || New York Islanders || 3–4 || Pittsburgh Penguins || 29–28–5 || 63
|- style="background:#fcf;"
| 63 || Feb 24 || Pittsburgh Penguins || 1–11 || Montreal Canadiens || 29–29–5 || 63
|- style="background:#fcf;"
| 64 || Feb 26 || Pittsburgh Penguins || 2–3 || Quebec Nordiques || 29–30–5 || 63
|- style="background:#cfc;"
| 65 || Feb 28 || New Jersey Devils || 1–2 || Pittsburgh Penguins || 30–30–5 || 65
|-

|- style="background:#fcf;"
| 66 || Mar 2 || Pittsburgh Penguins || 5–6 || New Jersey Devils || 30–31–5 || 65
|- style="background:#cfc;"
| 67 || Mar 4 || Minnesota North Stars || 6–8 || Pittsburgh Penguins || 31–31–5 || 67
|- style="background:#fcf;"
| 68 || Mar 6 || Pittsburgh Penguins || 3–4 OT || Edmonton Oilers || 31–32–5 || 67
|- style="background:#fcf;"
| 69 || Mar 7 || Pittsburgh Penguins || 3–6 || Calgary Flames || 31–33–5 || 67
|- style="background:#fcf;"
| 70 || Mar 10 || Pittsburgh Penguins || 2–8 || Los Angeles Kings || 31–34–5 || 67
|- style="background:#fcf;"
| 71 || Mar 11 || Pittsburgh Penguins || 3–5 || Vancouver Canucks || 31–35–5 || 67
|- style="background:#cfc;"
| 72 || Mar 15 || Detroit Red Wings || 1–6 || Pittsburgh Penguins || 32–35–5 || 69
|- style="background:#fcf;"
| 73 || Mar 17 || Minnesota North Stars || 6–2 || Pittsburgh Penguins || 32–36–5 || 69
|- style="background:#ffc;"
| 74 || Mar 18 || Pittsburgh Penguins || 2–2 || New York Islanders || 32–36–6 || 70
|- style="background:#fcf;"
| 75 || Mar 22 || Pittsburgh Penguins || 3–5 || Philadelphia Flyers || 32–37–6 || 70
|- style="background:#ffc;"
| 76 || Mar 24 || Calgary Flames || 3–3 || Pittsburgh Penguins || 32–37–7 || 71
|- style="background:#fcf;"
| 77 || Mar 25 || Pittsburgh Penguins || 2–4 || Hartford Whalers || 32–38–7 || 71
|- style="background:#ffc;"
| 78 || Mar 27 || Hartford Whalers || 3–3 || Pittsburgh Penguins || 32–38–8 || 72
|- style="background:#fcf;"
| 79 || Mar 29 || Pittsburgh Penguins || 4–5 || St. Louis Blues || 32–39–8 || 72
|- style="background:#fcf;"
| 80 || Mar 31 || Buffalo Sabres || 3–2 OT || Pittsburgh Penguins || 32–40–8 || 72
|-

|- style="text-align:center;"
| Legend:       = Win       = Loss       = Tie

Playoffs
The Penguins missed the playoffs, despite qualifying the previous year.

Player statistics
Skaters

Goaltenders

†Denotes player spent time with another team before joining the Penguins.  Stats reflect time with the Penguins only.
‡Denotes player was traded mid-season.  Stats reflect time with the Penguins only.

Awards and records
 Mario Lemieux, All-Star Game MVP 
 Mario Lemieux became the first person to score 800 points for the Penguins. He did so in a 4–3 win over Vancouver on January 4.
 Mario Lemieux established a new franchise record for goals (345). He broke the previous records of 316 held by Jean Pronovost.
 Paul Coffey established a franchise record for goals (74) by a defenseman. He broke the previous records of 66 held by both Ron Stackhouse and Randy Carlyle.
 Rod Buskas set a franchise record for penalty minutes (959). He had led the category since the previous season.

Transactions
The Penguins were involved in the following transactions during the 1989–90 season:

Trades

Free agents

Signings

Other

Draft picks

Pittsburgh Penguins' picks at the 1989 NHL Entry Draft.

Draft notes
 The Calgary Flames' sixth-round pick went to the Pittsburgh Penguins as a result of a January 9, 1989, trade that sent Steve Guenette to the Flames in exchange for this pick.

References
 Penguins on Hockey Database

Pittsburgh Penguins seasons
Pitts
Pitts
National Hockey League All-Star Game hosts
Pitts
Pitts